Lutheran schools in Australia are educational institutions set up under or affiliated to the Lutheran Church of Australia. This affiliation is via Lutheran Education Australia, through its three district offices (Lutheran Education Queensland, Lutheran Education South East Region (Victoria, New South Wales and Tasmania), and Lutheran Schools Association (South Australia, Northern Territory and Western Australia)).

Lutheran schools are accredited by the relevant state government authorities in Australia under the various education laws in place. For example, in New South Wales, the New South Wales Department of Education approves non-government schools under the Education Act 2000 (NSW).

In Australia, non-government schools are generally referred to as "independent schools". This does not indicate that they are independent of the education laws of Australia, only that their governing bodies are managed privately. In all respects, they must adhere to the relevant educational standards prescribed in school syllabus preferred by each state’s educational authority.

There are 1078 independent schools throughout Australia. The Australian Bureau of Statistics reports that there are 83 Lutheran schools which make up 6.4% of that total, being the sixth highest group when viewed by percentage of students attending.

Lutheran education institutions consider that the Christian Bible is essential in relation to educational subjects that relate to religious instruction or communal worship. For example, the specific prayer or devotions times for students during normal school time. However, Lutheran education institutions differ from some other Christian education schools by accepting that it is not always appropriate to apply biblical concepts to traditional curriculum areas, such as maths or science.

Lutheran schools attempt to place practising Lutherans and practising Christians of other Christian traditions first in enrolments. This is in contrast to some other Christian educational institutions, which take into account other non-religious criteria.

The following is a list of Lutheran educational institutions in Australia.

Preschools, kindergartens & family day care
Beenleigh Family Day Care Scheme, Beenleigh, Queensland
Calvary Kindergarten, Morphett Vale, South Australia
Carina Family Day Care Scheme, Mount Gravatt, Queensland
Centenary Christian Kindergarten and Preschool, Middle Park, Queensland
Concordia Lutheran Preschool Kindergarten, Murray Bridge, South Australia
Good Shepherd Lutheran Kindergarten & Child Care Centre, Hamilton, Victoria
Goombungee Little Folks Group, Goombungee, Queensland
Grace Creche and Kindergarten, Clontarf, Queensland
Grace Lutheran Preschool, Moree, New South Wales
Living Faith Early Learning Centre, Petrie, Queensland
Nazareth Community Kindergarten and Preschool & Early Learning Centre Woolloongabba, Queensland
New Life Lutheran Child Care Centre, Browns Plains, Queensland
Peace Lutheran Community Kindergarten, Cairns, Queensland
Raceview Bethany Lutheran Community Kindergarten, Raceview, Queensland
St James Lutheran Kindergarten & Child Care Centre Cleveland, Queensland
St Johns Lutheran Church Kindergarten, Eight Mile Plains, Queensland
St John's Lutheran Kindergarten, Geelong, Victoria
St John's Lutheran Kindergarten, Kingaroy, Queensland
St Marks Lutheran Early Learning Centre, Mount Gravatt, Queensland
St Martins Lutheran Preschool Kindergarten, Mount Gambier, South Australia
St Pauls Lutheran Child Care Centre, Nundah, Queensland
St Paul's Lutheran Child Care Centre, Townsville, Queensland
St Pauls Lutheran Child Care, Mount Isa, Queensland
St Paul's Lutheran Kindergarten Inc., St Marys, New South Wales
St Paul's Lutheran Kindergarten, Grovedale, Victoria
St Stephens Lutheran Community Kindergarten, Gladstone, Queensland
Trinity Kindergarten, Child Care Centre & Occasional Child Care Centre Southport, Queensland
Victoria Point Faith Lutheran Community Kindergarten, Victoria Point, Queensland
Zion Preschool Centre, Gawler, South Australia

Primary education & secondary education

New South Wales
Lutheran Primary School, Wagga Wagga, New South Wales
St John's Lutheran School Jindera Inc, Jindera, New South Wales
St Paul's College, Walla Walla, New South Wales
St Paul's Lutheran Primary School, Henty, New South Wales

Northern Territory
Good Shepherd Lutheran School, Palmerston, Northern Territory
Living Waters Lutheran Primary School, Alice Springs, Northern Territory
St Andrew Lutheran Primary School, Leanyer, Northern Territory
Yirara College, Alice Springs, Northern Territory

Queensland
Bethania Lutheran Primary School, Bethania, Queensland
Bethany Lutheran Primary School, Raceview, Queensland
Concordia Lutheran College, Toowoomba, Queensland
Faith Lutheran College, Plainland, Queensland
Faith Lutheran College, Redlands, Thornlands, Queensland and Victoria Point, Queensland
Good News Lutheran School, Middle Park, Queensland
Good Shepherd Lutheran College, Noosaville, Queensland
Grace Lutheran College, Rothwell, Queensland and Caboolture, Queensland
Grace Lutheran Primary School, Clontarf, Queensland
Immanuel Lutheran College, Buderim, Queensland
Living Faith Lutheran Primary School, Murrumba Downs, Queensland
Lutheran Ormeau Rivers District School (LORDS), Ormeau, Queensland
Pacific Lutheran College, Caloundra, Queensland
Peace Lutheran College, Cairns, Queensland 
Peace Lutheran Primary School, Gatton, Queensland
Prince of Peace Lutheran College, Everton Hills, Queensland
Redeemer Lutheran College, Rochedale, Queensland
Redeemer Lutheran College, Biloela, Queensland
St Andrews Lutheran College, Tallebudgera, Queensland
St James Lutheran College, Pialba, Queensland
St John's Lutheran Primary School, Bundaberg, Queensland
St Paul's Lutheran Primary School, Caboolture, Queensland
St Peters Lutheran College, Indooroopilly, Queensland
St Peters Lutheran College, Springfield, Queensland
St Stephens Lutheran College, Gladstone, Queensland
Trinity Lutheran College, Ashmore, Queensland

South Australia

Calvary Lutheran Primary School, Morphett Vale, South Australia
Concordia College, Highgate, South Australia
Cornerstone College, Mount Barker, South Australia
Crossways Lutheran School, Ceduna, South Australia
Encounter Lutheran College, Victor Harbor, South Australia
Endeavour College, Mawson Lakes, South Australia
Faith Lutheran College, Tanunda, South Australia
Golden Grove Lutheran Primary School, Golden Grove, South Australia
Good Shepherd Lutheran School, Para Vista, South Australia
Good Shepherd Lutheran School, Angaston, South Australia
Immanuel College, Novar Gardens, South Australia
Immanuel Lutheran Primary School, Novar Gardens, South Australia
Immanuel Lutheran School, Gawler East, South Australia
Lobethal Lutheran School, Lobethal, South Australia
Loxton Lutheran Primary School, Loxton, South Australia
Maitland Lutheran School, Maitland, South Australia
Our Saviour Lutheran School, Aberfoyle Park, South Australia
Redeemer Lutheran School, Nuriootpa, South Australia
Salisbury Lutheran Kindergarten, Salisbury, South Australia
St Jakobi Lutheran School, Lyndoch, South Australia
St John's Lutheran School, Eudunda, South Australia
St Mark's Lutheran School, Mount Barker, South Australia
St Martins Lutheran College, Mount Gambier, South Australia
St Michael's Lutheran School, Hahndorf, South Australia
St Paul Lutheran School, Blair Athol, South Australia
St Peters Lutheran School, Blackwood, South Australia
Tanunda Lutheran School, Tanunda, South Australia
Tatachilla Lutheran College, Tatachilla
Trinity Lutheran School, Spring Head, South Australia
Unity College, Murray Bridge, South Australia
Vineyard Lutheran School, Clare, South Australia
Waikerie Lutheran Primary School, Waikerie, South Australia

Tasmania
Eastside Lutheran College, Hobart, Tasmania

Victoria
Good News Lutheran College, Werribee, Victoria
Geelong Lutheran College, Geelong, Victoria
Good Shepherd College, Hamilton, Victoria
Holy Trinity Lutheran College, Horsham, Victoria
Lakeside College, Pakenham, Victoria
Luther College, Croydon, Victoria
Nhill Lutheran School, Nhill, Victoria
St John's Lutheran Primary School, Portland, Victoria
St John's Lutheran School, Geelong, Victoria
St Peter's Lutheran Primary School, Dimboola, Victoria
Sunshine Christian School, Sunshine, Victoria
Tarrington Lutheran School, Tarrington, Victoria
The Good Shepherd Lutheran Primary School, Croydon, Victoria
Trinity Lutheran College, Mildura, Victoria
Victory Lutheran College, Wodonga, Victoria

Western Australia
Living Waters Lutheran College, Warnbro, Western Australia
Ocean Forest Lutheran College, Dalyellup, Western Australia

Tertiary education
Australian Lutheran College, North Adelaide, South Australia

References

External links
 Lutheran Education in Australia

To useful books on the subject:
The Patriarchs: A History of Australian Lutheran Schooling 1839-1919 by Richard J. Hauser
The Pathfinders: A History of Australian Lutheran Schooling 1919-1999 by Richard J. Hauser
Both available from Amazon in Kindle format.

 
Lutheran schools